Wouldn't Change a Thing may refer to:

 "Wouldn't Change a Thing" (Kylie Minogue song)
 "Wouldn't Change a Thing" (Camp Rock song)
 "Wouldn't Change a Thing", a 2004 song by Haven